Rhopalinae is a subfamily of scentless plant bugs in the family Rhopalidae. There are at least 20 genera and more than 170 described species in Rhopalinae.

Genera
These 20 genera belong to the subfamily Rhopalinae:

 Agraphopus Stål, 1872
 Arhyssus Stål, 1870
 Aufeius Stål, 1870
 Brachycarenus Fieber, 1860
 Chorosoma Curtis, 1830
 Corizomorpha Jakovlev, 1883
 Corizus Fallén, 1814
 Harmostes Burmeister, 1835
 Ithamar Kirkaldy, 1902
 Leptoceraea Jakovlev, 1873
 Limacocarenus Kiritshenko, 1914
 Liorhyssus Stål, 1870
 Maccevethus Dallas, 1852
 Myrmus Hahn, 1832
 Niesthrea Spinola, 1837
 Peliochrous Stål, 1873
 Punjentorhopalus Ahmad & Rizvi, 1999
 Rhopalus Schilling, 1827
 Stictopleurus Stål, 1872
 Xenogenus Berg, 1883

References

External links 

 BioLib: Rhopalinae Amyot & Serville, 1843
 

 
Rhopalidae